Kolesnikov (masculine) or Kolesnikova (feminine) is a Russian surname which means "son of wheelwright". Notable persons with that name include:

Anastasiya Kolesnikova (born 1984), Russian gymnast
Andrei Kolesnikov (footballer) (born 1984), Russian soccer player
Andrei Kolesnikov (general), Russian major-general
Andrei Kolesnikov (ice hockey) (born 1989), Russian ice hockey player
Andrey Vladimirovich Kolesnikov (born 1965), Russian journalist and author
Borys Kolesnikov (born 1962), Ukrainian politician and entrepreneur 
Dmitry Kolesnikov, Russian submarine captain
Evgeny Kolesnikov (born 1985),  Russian basketball player
Irina Kolesnikova (born 1980), Russian ballet dancer
Irina Kolesnikova (curler) (born 1964), Russian curler and coach
Maria Kolesnikova (born 1982), Belarusian politician
Mikhail Kolesnikov (politician) (1939–2007), Russian general and defense minister
Mikhail Kolesnikov (footballer, born 1966), Soviet and Russian footballer
Nadezhda Ilyina (née Kolesnikova; 1949–2013), Soviet-Russian sprinter
Nikolai N. Kolesnikov (born 1959, Russian physicist
Nikolay Kolesnikov (weightlifter) (born 1952), Soviet weightlifter
Nikolay Kolesnikov (sprinter) (born 1953), Soviet sprinter
Oleg Kolesnikov (born 1968), Russian politician
Ruslan Kolesnikov (born 2000), Russian boxer
Sergey Kolesnikov (cyclist) (born 1989), Russian road cyclist
Sergei Kolesnikov (whistleblower) (born 1948), Russian businessman
Stepan Kolesnikoff (1879–1955), Russian painter
Tetiana Kolesnikova (born 1977), Ukrainian rower
Vladimir Kolesnikov (born 1948), Russian lawyer and politician

See also
14354 Kolesnikov, an asteroid named after Yevgeni Kolesnikov
Kolesnik

Russian-language surnames